Olena Anatoliivna Netetska (born 1972) is a Ukrainian politician. From 2006 to 2014 she was a member of the Ukrainian parliament, the Verkhovna Rada, for the Party of Regions. In her last tenure (2012 to 2014) she represented Ukraine's 3rd electoral district in the Autonomous Republic of Crimea.

Early life and education
Netetska was born on 27 October 1972 in Makiivka, Donetsk Oblast. She graduated in law from the business and law faculty of the Donetsk National University

Employment in public administration
Netetska began to work in public administration during her studies. From 1992 to 1997 she was secretary and trainer in the social protection department of the city administration in Makiivka. From 1997 to 2002 she was a trainer in the organization department of the city council, and in 2002 she was appointed as head of the department. From 2003 to 2005 she was deputy chief of staff of the Donetsk Regional Administration.

Political career
Netetska was elected in May 2006 in the 2006 Ukrainian parliamentary election as a member of the Verkhovna Rada (Ukraine's national parliament) for the Party of Regions. In the 2007 Ukrainian parliamentary election she was reelected for the same party. Both these elections were held according to the party-list proportional election system—that is, in a single nationwide electoral district.

After the 2012 Ukrainian parliamentary election (which did have constituency seats) Netetska returned to parliament representing Ukraine's 3rd electoral district in the Autonomous Republic of Crimea as again a Party of Regions candidate. Netetska won her district with 50,37% of the vote. She was a member of parliament until 2014.

References

External links
  Parliamentary profile

1972 births
Living people
People from Makiivka
Party of Regions politicians
21st-century Ukrainian women politicians
Fifth convocation members of the Verkhovna Rada
Sixth convocation members of the Verkhovna Rada
Seventh convocation members of the Verkhovna Rada
Donetsk National University alumni
Women members of the Verkhovna Rada